Shiu-Fung Jong is an I-Kiribati politician. She is a member of parliament for the Tarawa Urban constituency, from the Pillars of Truth (Boutokan te Koaua) party. She was first elected in the 2015–16 Kiribati parliamentary election.

She is the wife of Jeff Jong.

References

Living people
Members of the House of Assembly (Kiribati)
Year of birth unknown
Pillars of Truth politicians
21st-century I-Kiribati politicians
21st-century I-Kiribati women politicians
Year of birth missing (living people)